Mark Alor Powell (born 1968) is an American photographer. He is best known for his photos of street scenes and unusual people in Detroit and Mexico City.

Life and work
Powell was born in 1968 in Decatur, Illinois.

He was a member of the In-Public street photography collective.

Publications

Publications by Powell
V.I.P. (Very Important Person). Mexico City: Diamantina, 2006. .
Open at Noon. Mexico City: Editorial RM, 2014. .

Publications with contributions by Powell
Fotolog Book: A Global Snapshot for the Digital Age. London: Thames and Hudson, 2006. . Over 1,000 images selected from the online photo journals found on the Fotolog photoblog website.
La Ciudad de Mexico (translation: Mexico City). Mexico City: Fundación Televisa, 2008. Spanish.
Los que se Quedan (translation: Those Who Remain). Mexico City: Diamantina, 2009. . Spanish. "Book inspired by the documentary film that speaks with families in Mexico of people who have gone to work in the United States. Touches on the economic and social impact on the divided families from the point of view of those who remain in Mexico, rather than those who emigrate."
Street Photography Now. London: Thames & Hudson, 2010.  (hardback). London: Thames & Hudson, 2011.  (paperback). Edited by Sophie Howarth and Stephen McLaren.
100 Great Street Photographs. Munich, London, New York: Prestel, 2017. By David Gibson. . Contains a commentary on and a photograph by Powell.

References

External links

American photographers
American expatriates in Mexico
Living people
1968 births
Street photographers